Donna Murphy (born March 7, 1959) is an American actress, best known for her work in musical theater. A five-time Tony Award nominee, she has twice won the Tony for Best Actress in a Musical: for her role as Fosca in Passion (1994–1995) and as Anna Leonowens in The King and I (1996–1997). She was also nominated for her roles as Ruth Sherwood in Wonderful Town (2003), Lotte Lenya in LoveMusik (2007) and Bubbie/Raisel in The People in the Picture (2011).

Murphy made her Broadway debut as a replacement in the 1979 musical They're Playing Our Song. Her other stage credits include the original off-Broadway productions of Song of Singapore (1991) and Hello Again (1993), as well as the alternate to Bette Midler as the title character in a Broadway revival of Hello, Dolly! (2017–2018). In 1997, she won a Daytime Emmy Award for Outstanding Performer in a Children's Special for her role in Someone Had to be Benny, an episode of the HBO series Lifestories: Families in Crisis. Her film roles include Anij in Star Trek: Insurrection (1998), Rosalie Octavius in Spider-Man 2 (2004), Mother Gothel in the animated film Tangled (2010), and one of the government secretaries in The Bourne Legacy (2012). As of 2022, she portrays Caroline Astor in the HBO series The Gilded Age.

Early life and education

Murphy, the eldest of seven children, was born in Corona, Queens, New York, the daughter of Jeanne (née Fink) and Robert Murphy, an aerospace engineer. Murphy is of Irish, French, German, and Czech ancestry. Her family moved to Hauppauge, Long Island, New York. At age three, she asked for voice lessons, and she put on shows as a child in Hauppauge. She later moved to Topsfield, Massachusetts and graduated from Masconomet Regional High School in 1977.

Career

Murphy dropped out of the New York University drama program in her sophomore year when she was cast to understudy the three backup singers in the 1979 Broadway musical They're Playing Our Song. In a 2007 interview, Murphy explained, "At the end of my sophomore year, I took a leave of absence. I needed to audition without cutting classes." She also studied at the Lee Strasberg Theatre Institute.

She has appeared in many off-Broadway productions, including the musical Francis in 1981 at the York Theatre at St. Peter's, The Mystery of Edwin Drood in 1985 at the Public Theater's Delacorte Theatre, Birds of Paradise in 1987 (Promenade Theatre), Privates on Parade (Roundabout Theatre) in 1989, the musical Song of Singapore in 1991, the Michael John LaChiusa musical Hello Again at the Lincoln Center Mitzi Newhouse Theater in 1993, Twelve Dreams at the Mitzi Newhouse Theater in 1995, and Helen at the Public Theater/New York Shakespeare Festival in 2002. In 2012, she appeared in Stephen Sondheim's Into the Woods at The Public Theater's Delacorte Theatre as the Witch.
  
On Broadway, after They're Playing Our Song (1979), she was an understudy in the musical/opera The Human Comedy in April 1984 and played various roles in The Mystery of Edwin Drood from 1985 to 1987. She also played Audrey in Howard Ashman and Alan Menken's Little Shop of Horrors. In 1994, she played the role of Fosca in Stephen Sondheim's and James Lapine's Passion, winning the Tony Award for Best Actress in a Musical for her performance. A year later she appeared in Lapine's revival, Twelve Dreams. In 1996, she played Anna Leonowens in the revival of The King and I alongside Lou Diamond Phillips, also recording a cast album. The role earned her a second Tony Award for Best Actress in a Musical. She appeared as Ruth Sherwood in a revival of Wonderful Town from 2003 to 2005 (having previously performed in the New York City Center Encores! 2000 staged concert of that musical), and was nominated for the Tony Award, Best Actress in a Musical and won the Drama Desk Award for Outstanding Actress in a Musical. In 2007, she appeared in LoveMusik as Lotte Lenya, opposite Michael Cerveris as Kurt Weill, receiving nominations for Tony and Drama Desk Awards. She appeared in the 2007 New York City Center Encores! staged concert of Follies as Phyllis. She appeared in the Roundabout Theatre production of a new musical, The People in the Picture, which opened on April 28, 2011, and closed on June 19, 2011. She was nominated for a 2011 Tony Award for Leading Actress in a Musical for her role in the production.

She appeared in the Broadway revival of Hello, Dolly! as Dolly Levi, the alternate to Bette Midler on Tuesday evenings and other select performances. She played her last performance on January 7, 2018. Murphy returned to Hello, Dolly! for six performances (July 22 and 29, August 5, 12, 19, and 20) when Midler rejoined the musical before it closed on August 25, 2018.

Murphy's film roles include Anij, Captain Jean-Luc Picard's love interest, in Star Trek: Insurrection (1998), in the film Center Stage, as a ballet teacher (2000), as Rosalie Octavius, wife of Dr. Otto Octavius, the film's villain in Spider-Man 2 (2004), as Betty, a surgical research assistant in Darren Aronofsky's film The Fountain (2006), and Scarlett Johansson's mother in The Nanny Diaries (2007). As Mother Gothel in the animated musical film Tangled (2010) she sang the song "Mother Knows Best". She played Kathleen, Vera Farmiga's mother in Higher Ground (2011) and Marie in Dark Horse (2011). In 2012, she appeared as government secretary Dita Mandy, in The Bourne Legacy.

On television, Murphy appeared in the NBC soap opera Another World from 1989 through 1991 as District Attorney Morgan Graves. She won an Emmy in 1997, for playing Armando Agrelo in "Someone Had to be Benny" (1996), an episode of the HBO series Lifestories: Families in Crisis. Other television series roles include a recurring role as Abigail Adams in Liberty! The American Revolution (1997), Murder One (1995–1996), Law & Order as Carla Tyrell in a recurring role (2000), Hack (2002–2003), Trust Me (2009) and Quantico (2017). Her voice-over work in TV commercials, includes the Le Vian chocolate diamonds series for Jared Jewelry. In 2022 Murphy recurred on HBO's The Gilded Age as Caroline Schermerhorn Astor.

Personal life

Murphy was married to actor and singer Shawn Elliott from 1990 until his death in March 2016. She is the stepmother of Elliott's two daughters. In 2005, they adopted a daughter from Guatemala.

Stage

Filmography

Film

Television

Video games

Awards and nominations

References

External links

 Official Donna Murphy Facebook Page
 
 
 
 
 
 2007 Interview with Donna Murphy at The Sondheim Review

1959 births
Living people
Actresses from New York City
American film actresses
American musical theatre actresses
American stage actresses
American voice actresses
American television actresses
American people of Czech descent
American people of French descent
American people of German descent
American people of Irish descent
Lee Strasberg Theatre and Film Institute alumni
Tisch School of the Arts alumni
People from Corona, Queens
Tony Award winners
Drama Desk Award winners
People from Topsfield, Massachusetts
People from Hauppauge, New York
20th-century American actresses
21st-century American actresses
Actresses from Massachusetts
Masconomet Regional High School alumni